Olearia rugosa, commonly known as wrinkled daisy-bush, is a species of flowering plant in the family Asteraceae. It has alternate, wrinkled leaves and white daisy-like flowers and is endemic to south-eastern Australia.

Description
The leaf margins are broadly toothed to scalloped, flat or curved under, rarely smooth. The bracts toothed, margins sometimes purple coloured, densely covered with short, matted, star-shaped hairs or only near the apex.

Taxonomy and naming
This species was first formally described in 1861 by William Archer who gave it the name Eurybia rugosa in the Journal of the Proceedings of the Linnean Society, Botany, from an unpublished description by Ferdinand von Mueller. In 1917 John Hutchinson changed the name to Olearia rugosa in The Gardeners' Chronicle. The specific epithet (rugosa) means "wrinkled".

In 2013, five subspecies of O. rugosa were described in Australian Systematic Botany and the names are accepted by the Australian Plant Census:
 Olearia rugosa subsp. intermedia Messina has leaves that are intermediate in shape between those of subsp. allenderae and subsp. angustifolia.

† The type specimens of O. allenderae were collected by Marie Allender.

Distribution and habitat
Subspecies allenderae grows in swampy areas or on gully slopes in forest and is restricted to Wilsons Promontory National Park and subsp. angustifolia usually grows in streams or swamps in near-coastal areas of East Gippsland in Victoria. Subspecies distaliloba grows in mountain forest, often in gullies and depressions, from far south-eastern New South Wales and east of the Snowy River in Victoria. Subspecies intermedia is restricted to some Bass Strait Islands and north-eastern Tasmania and subsp. rugosa is found in moist forests, mostly on the Great Dividing Range between Mount Macedon and Drouin in central southern Victoria.

Conservation status
Subspecies allenderae is listed as "endangered" under the Victorian Government Flora and Fauna Guarantee Act 1988.

References

rugosa
Eudicots of Australia
Flora of New South Wales
Flora of Victoria (Australia)
Flora of Tasmania
Plants described in 1861